Waugh Peak is a rock peak, 2,430 m, standing just southeast of Breyer Mesa at the west side of Amundsen Glacier, in the Queen Maud Mountains. Named by Advisory Committee on Antarctic Names (US-ACAN) after Douglas Waugh, Chief Cartographer with the Geological Society of America from 1963, who has contributed much to the Society's Antarctic mapping program.

Mountains of the Ross Dependency
Amundsen Coast